Paul John Ferguson, FRCO (born 13 July 1955) is a Church of England bishop. Since 2014, he has been the Bishop of Whitby.

Ferguson was educated at Birkenhead School; New College, Oxford; and Westcott House, Cambridge. He was made a deacon at Petertide 1985 (30 June), by Ronald Brown, Bishop of Birkenhead, at St Mary-without-the-Walls, Chester, and ordained a priest the Petertide following (29 June 1986), by Michael Baughen, Bishop of Chester, at Chester Cathedral. After a curacy at St Mary, Chester he was Curate, Chaplain, Sacrist and Precentor at Westminster Abbey from 1988 to 1995. After this he was Precentor and a Residentiary Canon at York Minster until his appointment as Archdeacon of Cleveland in 2001.

He was consecrated at York Minster on 3 July 2014 by John Sentamu, Archbishop of York. In the vacancy in See between the retirement of Sentamu and the confirmation of Stephen Cottrell, Ferguson was acting diocesan bishop.

References

1955 births
Alumni of New College, Oxford
Alumni of Westcott House, Cambridge
Archdeacons of Cleveland
Bishops of Whitby
Living people
People educated at Birkenhead School